George Linton may refer to:

George Linton (Jamaican cricketer) (1873–1960), Jamaican cricketer
George Linton (Barbadian cricketer) (1956–2014), Barbadian cricketer